Starink is a surname. Notable people with the surname include:

 Brenda Starink (born 1974), Dutch backstroke swimmer
 Ed Starink (born 1952), Dutch composer, arranger, session musician and record producer
 Mike Starink (born 1970), Dutch television presenter and stage actor

Dutch-language surnames